Masami Tachikawa (立川真紗美, born 16 November 1980) is a Japanese basketball player who competed in the 2004 Summer Olympics.

References

1980 births
Living people
Japanese women's basketball players
Olympic basketball players of Japan
Basketball players at the 2004 Summer Olympics
Basketball players at the 2002 Asian Games
Asian Games competitors for Japan